Irma Kliauzaitė is a Lithuanian pianist settled in Austria. She has performed internationally.

Kliauzaite graduated in the Salzburg's Mozarteum in 1996, and was decorated the Mozarteum Foundation's Bernhard Paumgartner-Medal. She has also been awarded the Bösendorfer Prize.

References 
  Biography at Mozarteum University of Salzburg

Lithuanian classical pianists
Lithuanian women pianists
Living people
21st-century classical pianists
Year of birth missing (living people)
21st-century women pianists